Igra bez granica (English translation: "Games Without Borders") is the seventh studio album by the famous Macedonian singer Toše Proeski. The album was released in Macedonia and subsequently in Bosnia and Herzegovina,  Croatia, Montenegro, Serbia and Slovenia under the Croatian language title Igra bez granica.

Reception
Igra bez granica is the most successful album in Toše's career. However he died close after the album was released, so he was not able to get all the prizes for the album who were delivered to his family. The songs "Igra bez granica", "Creša", and "Sreḱna li si ti" became hits. In Croatia the songs "Još i danas zamiriši trešnja" (in Macedonian "creša") and "Nesanica" got the awards 'Hit of the year' and 'Hr TOP 20' respectively.

Track listing
"Duša ostana" (The Soul Remained)
music: Miro Buljanarrangement: Miro Buljanlyrics: Vesna Malinova
"Nikoj kako tebe ne baknuva" (No One Kisses Like You)
music: Srđan Simić Kambaarrangement: Nikša Bratošlyrics: Vesna Malinova
"Bože, čuvaj ja od zlo" (God, Keep Her Away From Malice)
music: Miro Buljanarrangement: Miro Buljanlyrics: Antonija Šola translation: Vesna Malinova
"Mesečina" (Moonlight)
music: Toše Proeskiarrangement: Toše Proeskilyrics: Antonija Šola translation: Vesna Malinova
"Igri bez granici" (Games Without Borders)
music: Miroslav Rusarrangement: Nikša Bratošlyrics: Miroslav Rus translation: Vlado Janevski
"Sreḱna li si ti" (Are You Happy)
music: Miro Buljanarrangement: Miro Buljanlyrics: Antonija Šola translation: Vesna Malinova
"Najdraga moja" (My Dearest)
music: Zoran Lekovićarrangement: Nikša Bratošlyrics: Vesna Malinova 
"Jas ne sum vinoven" (It's not my fault)
music: Miroslav Rusarrangement: Nikša Bratošlyrics: Miroslav Rus translation: Vesna Malinova
"Creša" (Cherry Tree)
music: Miroslav Drljača Rusarrangement: Nikša Bratošlyrics: Miroslav Rus translation: Vesna Malinova

Single tracks
"Volim osmijeh tvoj" ft. Antonija Šola (I Love Your Smile)
music: Miro Buljanarrangement: Miro Buljanlyrics: Antonija Šola
"Veži me za sebe" (Bind Me to Yourself)
music: Miro Buljanarrangement: Miro Buljanlyrics: Antonija Šola
"Ostala si uvijek ista" (You remained always the same)
"Srce nije kamen" (The Heart Isn't Made of Stone)
music: Miro Buljanarrangement: Miro Buljanlyrics: Antonija Šola 
"Nesanica" (Insomnia)
music: Dejan Ivanovićarrangement: Nikša Bratošlyrics: Dejan Ivanović 
"Nesanica (remix)" (Insomnia)
music: Dejan Ivanovićarrangement: Nikša Bratošlyrics: Dejan Ivanović 
"Feeling Good"
music: / arrangement: /lyrics: /
"Moja (Slovenian version)"
music: / arrangement: /lyrics: /

Charts

Release history

References

2007 albums
Toše Proeski albums